Predrag Momirović (born 19 July 1977) is a Serbian sprinter. He competed in the men's 4 × 100 metres relay at the 2000 Summer Olympics representing Yugoslavia.

References

1977 births
Living people
Athletes (track and field) at the 2000 Summer Olympics
Serbian male sprinters
Olympic athletes of Yugoslavia
Place of birth missing (living people)